Kopač, Kopáč or Kopăç may refer to:

People
 , Czech football club manager
 Jiří Kopáč (born 1982), Czech rower
 Mojca Kopač (born 1975), Slovenian figure skater
 Primož Kopač (born 1970), Slovenian ski jumper
 Slavko Kopač (1913–1995), Croatian-French artist and poet

Other
 Kopáč passive sensor
 Kopačevo (Hungarian: Kopăç), settlement in Croatia

See also